Sant Vicenç de Castellet is a municipality in the comarca of the Bages in 
Catalonia, Spain. It is situated near the confluence of the Llobregat river and the Cardener river. 
The railway station serves both the FGC line R5 between Barcelona and 
Manresa and the RENFE line between Barcelona and Zaragoza. The C-1411 road links the municipality with 
Martorell and Manresa.

The ruins of both Castellet castle and of a Roman tomb (third century, known locally as la Torre del Breny) are visible.

Demography 

| pop_2022=3

References

 Panareda Clopés, Josep Maria; Rios Calvet, Jaume; Rabella Vives, Josep Maria (1989). Guia de Catalunya, Barcelona: Caixa de Catalunya.  (Spanish).  (Catalan).

External links
Official website 
 Government data pages 
Information at Consell Comarcal del Bages 

Municipalities in Bages